Tout un jour is francophone Canadian pop singer Isabelle Boulay's fourth studio album, released in May 2004.  It contains a duet with Johnny Hallyday, "Tout au bout de nos peines," which was a top ten hit in France and Belgium.  The album was in these countries very successful, making the top five and remaining on the French charts for almost two years.

Track listing

 "C'est quoi, c'est l'habitude" — 4:11
 "Une autre vie" — 3:56
 "Ici" — 3:35
 "Aimons-nous" — 3:38
 "Celui qui dort avec moi" — 3:46
 "Un chanteur sans mélodie" — 3:43
 "En t'attendant" — 4:22
 "Tout un jour" — 3:45
 "J'irai jusqu'au bout" — 4:21
 "Jamais" — 4:35
 "Tout au bout de nos peines" duet with Johnny Hallyday — 3:34
 "Je sais ton nom" — 5:58
 "Telle que je suis" — 4:03
 "Je voudrais" — 2:21

Certifications

Charts

References

2004 albums
Isabelle Boulay albums
V2 Records albums